A grenadier was originally a specialized assault soldier for siege operations, later an honorific applied to many infantry military units.

Grenadier or Grenadiers may also refer to:

Military units
 Grenadiers à Cheval de la Garde Impériale, a disbanded heavy cavalry regiment of France
 Grenadier Guards, a regiment in the British Army
 The Grenadiers, a regiment in the Indian Army
 The Canadian Grenadier Guards, a regiment in the Canadian Army
 101st Grenadiers, a regiment of the former British Indian Army, now known as the Indian Grenadiers
 Potsdam Grenadiers, an 18th-century regiment of the Prussian Guard
 Swiss Grenadiers, an infantry corps of the Swiss Army

Animals
 Common grenadier (Uraeginthus granatina), a species of estrildid finch (passerine birds), found in drier land of southern Africa
 Purple grenadier (Uraeginthus ianthinogaster),  a species of estrildid finch (passerine birds), found in eastern Africa
 Grenadiers (fish) or rattails, deep-sea fish in the family Macrouridae

Other uses
 Grenadier (manga), a Japanese anime/manga series about a female gunslinger
 The Grenadier (magazine), a wargaming magazine
 USS Grenadier, multiple ships of the United States Navy
 Grenadier Models Inc., a miniature figures manufacturer
 Grenadier (apple), an apple cultivar
 Ineos Grenadier, an off-road utility vehicle
 Les Grenadiers (Op. 207), title of a waltz by Émile Waldteufel, and named after the British regiment
 Grenadier (wargame), a 1972 Napoleonic board wargame

See also
 The British Grenadiers, a traditional tune